Listed below are the dates and results for the tournament qualification. A total of 17 CONCACAF teams entered the competition. Honduras withdrew before the matches were played. The remaining 16 teams were divided into 3 zones, based on geographical considerations, as follows:
North American Zone had 3 teams. The teams played against each other on a home-and-away basis. The group winner and runner-up would advance to the Final Round.
Central American Zone had 4 teams. The teams played against each other on a home-and-away basis. The group winner and runner-up would advance to the Final Round.
Caribbean Zone had 9 teams, which would be divided into 2 groups of 4 or 5 teams. The teams played in a knockout tournament, with matches on a home-and-away basis. The group winners would advance to the Final Round.

CONCACAF North American Zone

 

 

 

 

 

Canada and United States finished level on points and goal difference, and a play-off on neutral ground was played to decide who would advance to the Final Round.

Mexico and Canada advanced to the tournament.

CONCACAF Central American Zone

 

 

 

 

 

 

 

 

 

 

 

Guatemala and El Salvador advanced to the tournament.

CONCACAF Caribbean Zone

Group A

First round

Suriname advanced to the Second Round.
 

The aggregate score was tied 2–2, and a play-off was played to decide who would advance to the Second Round.

Trinidad and Tobago advanced to the Second Round, via the play-off.

Second round

The aggregate score was tied 3–3, and a play-off on neutral ground was played to decide who would advance to the tournament.

Suriname advanced to the tournament, via the play-off.

Group B

Preliminary round

Haiti advanced to the First Round.

First round

Haiti advanced to the Second Round.
 

Cuba advanced to the Second Round.

Second round

The aggregate score was tied 2–2, and a play-off on neutral ground was played to decide who would advance to the Final Round.

Haiti advanced to the tournament, via the play-off.

Goalscorers

6 goals

 Emmanuel Sanon

5 goals

 Óscar Enrique Sánchez
 Luis Ramírez Zapata
 Roy George

4 goals

 Pierre Bayonne
 Leintz Domingue
 Steve David

3 goals

 Victor Clarke
 Javier Jiménez
 Selvin Pennant

2 goals

 Bob Bolitho
 Johnny Alvarado Cascante
 Francisco Fariñas
 David Arnoldo Cabrera
 Victor Manuel Mejia Valencia
 Peter Sandoval
 Remie Olmberg
 Sammy Llewellyn

1 goal

 Brian Budd
 Bob Lenarduzzi
 Buzz Parsons
 Mario Barrantes
 Javier Masís
 William Fisher Salgado
 Dagoberto Lara
 Ramón Núñez
 Agustín Pérez Castillo
 Miguel Rivero
 Andrés Roldán
 Silvio Aquino
 Julio César Anderson
 Leonardo McNish
 Felix McDonald
 Benjamin Monterroso
 Vibert Butts
 Keith Niles
 Arsène Auguste
 Jean Marie Jean Baptiste
 Carlo Brevil
 Jean-Claude Désir
 Louidor Labissiere
 Carl Brown
 Pedro Damián Álvarez
 Hugo Dávila
 Francisco Solís
 Monico Eluterio Ruiz
 Hector Nestor Hernández
 Daniel Montillo Ruíz
 Federico Ponce
 Agustín Sánchez
 Luis Ernesto Tapia
 Virgílio Vázquez
 Rinaldo Entingh
 Henry Playfair
 Leon Carpette
 Anthony Douglas
 Selris Figaro
 Boris Bandov
 Miro Rys
 Juli Veee

1 own goal

 Victor Clarke (playing against Trinidad and Tobago)
 Allan Wellmann (playing against Panama)

References

CONCACAF Gold Cup qualification
qualification
qualification